Samuel Chew (October 30, 1693 – June 16, 1743) was a physician who served as chief justice of colonial Delaware.

Life
Samuel married Mary Galloway in 1715, and their son Benjamin Chew was later Chief Justice of Pennsylvania.
His first wife died in 1734, and he married Mary Paca Galloway in 1736.
Originally he lived on his family's estate of Maidstone in Anne Arundel County, Maryland.
The manor house still stands although, since borders have changed, it is now in Calvert County, Maryland.

In 1738, he moved to build an estate known as Whitehall in Kent County, Delaware.
Pennsylvania Governor John Penn appointed him Chief Justice of the lower counties (or Delaware) in 1741.

He was influential among the Quakers, but provoked criticism by an address to the grand jury of Newcastle on the lawfulness of resistance to an armed enemy (printed 1741, reprinted in 1775).

Notes

Attribution

References
The Maidstone Manor's history

External links
Biography at Virtualology.com (based on older edition of Appletons' — 1891?)

1693 births 
1743 deaths
Chew family
Chief Justices of Delaware
People of colonial Delaware
18th-century American physicians
People from Anne Arundel County, Maryland
People from Kent County, Delaware